Netechma altitudinaria is a species of moth of the family Tortricidae. It is found in Pichincha Province, Ecuador.

The wingspan is 17 mm. The ground colour of the forewings is brownish cream with brownish suffusions and some rust scales in the postbasal area. The hindwings are cream with more grey strigulation (fine streaks).

Etymology
The species name refers to the high altitude of the collection site.

References

Moths described in 2008
Netechma